Tuntenhausen is a municipality  in the district of Rosenheim in Bavaria in Germany.

There are 57 official districts of Tuntenhausen, namely Tuntenhausen itself, Antersberg, Aubenhausen, Bach, Berg, Beyharting, Biberg, Bichl (this Bichl is an ), Bichl (this Bichl is a Weiler (hamlet)), Bolkam, Brettschleipfen, Dettendorf, Eggarten, Eisenbartling, Emling, Fischbach, Fuchsholz, Großrain, Guperding, Haus, Höglhaus, Hohenthann, Holzbichl, Hopfen, Hörmating, Innerthann, Jakobsberg, Karlsried, Knogl, Kronbichl, Lampferding, Mailling, Maxlrain, Moosmühle, Mühlholz, Neureith, Nordhof, Oberrain, Oed, Ostermünchen, Pangraz, Schlafthal, Schmidhausen, Schönau, Schwaig, Schweizerberg, Schweizerting, Seisrain, Sindlhausen, Söhl, Stetten (this Stetten is a Dorf (village)), Stetten (this Stetten is an Einöde), Thal, Unterrain, Voglried, Weiching, Weng.

Ostermünchen is a station of the Munich–Rosenheim railway and served about once per hour by local trains.

The town is known best for its church, a destination for Roman Catholic pilgrims in Bavaria.

The name of the town translates to "sissy town" or "fag town" what makes it sound funny to some German-speakers.

References

Rosenheim (district)
Catholic pilgrimage sites